Jim McCullough is an American politician who has served in the Vermont House of Representatives since 2002.

References

Living people
University of Vermont alumni
21st-century American politicians
Democratic Party members of the Vermont House of Representatives
Politicians from Burlington, Vermont
Year of birth missing (living people)